Andrei Ivanovich may refer to:

Andrei Ivanovich Kobyla, 14th century progenitor of the House of Romanov
Andrei Ivanovich Osterman (1686–1747), German-born Russian statesman who rose under Peter the Great
Andrei Ivanovich Bogdanov (1692–1766), Russian bibliographer
Andrei Ivanovich Zhelyabov (1851–1881), Russian revolutionary, member of the executive committee of Narodnaya Volya
Andrei Ivanovich Shingarev (1869–1918), Russian doctor, publicist and politician
Andrey Ivanovich Lavrov, Russian handball goalkeeper and Olympic champion